Carlos Albert Andrés (born 24 February 1978) is a Spanish sculptor. He was one of  the Group 99, whose manifesto intends to exalt the traditional values art. Albert works mainly with wrought iron and weathering steel. He considers Sculpture to share many of the features of drawing, and emphasizes in his work, skill and handling of these materials, especially iron, making drawings of his pieces "three-dimensional" creating empty spaces in the masses from tracks that seem to come alive. In his artistic creations is more important what he evokes and suggests to the viewer that what is represented. His career is part of abstract art.

Biography 

Albert was born on 24 February 1978  in Madrid. His artistic drive started very young. In 1996 he joined the Faculty of Fine Arts at the Complutense University of Madrid and four years later, the university granted a stay of studies at Camberwell College of Arts (University of the Arts London), also enriching his artistic training. This year was key for his career, because it was exposed for the first time in an art gallery participating in the project entitled Collective Will of Iron.

In 2001 he obtained a degree in Fine Arts, also winning the First Prize in the Visual Arts awarded by the Faculty. That same year, he obtained a grant from the Ministry of Culture of Luxembourg to take part in European Circle courses for the Propagation of the Arts, which served to expand their knowledge in the field.

After his studies of fine art, two years later he obtained the Diploma of Advanced Studies at the same university which represents the Art Fair Madrid, being awarded that year with several awards.

During his college days, Albert began with diverse materials, until he met the wrought iron that marked his artistic evolution. His current work comes from iron complex networks, whose hallmark is the balance of forms that fold by resounding losses in the material and the search for movement in most parts.

A significant moment in his artistic beginnings, was the meeting in Santander with the sculptor Martin Chirino, thanks to a grant from the Marcelino Botin Foundation in 1999. Along with this artist, he began special training in working with forging and sculptural conception.

During these years, Albert began to enter fully into the exhibition circuit by grants from entities such as Elsa Peretti Foundation and various competitions that in 2001, among others, awarded him the First Prize for Sculpture at the University of Seville. This same year he also participated in a group exhibition in the presence of his teacher Martin Chirino and was a breakthrough year for the artist that marked a before and after in his professional beginnings to the creation of the first monumental works, this time for the City Council of Móstoles. This was the beginning of his work as a sculptor of large pieces that soon after, in 2005, after receiving a number of awards and commissions from various public and private Spanish banks, his role was strengthened as a monumental sculptor to the present, we can see his work at various public spaces of several Spanish cities.

A significant example in this regard is the Door of Tolerance sculpture, which is 15 meters high and 20 meters wide, at the entrance of the town of Parla.

His way of working is guided by traditional values of composition and drawing, values that apply in all of his sculptures. Albert is an artist attached to the classics. Defend the traditional fundamental principle and basis of artistic creation.

Amazed at the ease with which he shapes the iron, as if shaping mud with waves and straight lines. The smoothness of the curves and the lightness of the forms denote an absolute master at manipulating the wrought iron.

An inspiration for his works will be cut up sections of the ship yards in Bueu Nodosa (Pontevedra), which also produced two of his monumental sculptures located in Cangas de Morrazo and Parla.

This will be the beginning of a series of naval-themed pieces, under the title of Marine Architecture, presented later in several solo exhibitions. The first was shown at the Gallery Four Seventeen of Madrid in 2006 as part of a larger project called Forged Spaces I, with works produced in sheets of steel, where the search space harmonic built was a constant.

Along with the search for traditional values, another important feature that stands out in the creation process of this sculptor, is intuition. This feature of the way he works can be perceived especially in small works, some of them leaving a clear footprint manifested as almost sketches of preparatory pieces that would seem to build the final work. However, there is a perfect calculation of all the weights. They are pieces that despite their apparent instability, maintain a great harmony as a whole.

Sketches seem to be also the series of collages that the artist made in refined style, with contrasting colors and lines. His compositions also reveal gaps, sometimes occupied by fields of color. They also present the intuitive nature that permeates many of his sculptures and you can guess a spontaneity in the execution of his strokes.

Combinations of different forms on paper that also have their counterpart in other materials such as steel cut on which Albert constructed reliefs, from the union of several plates worked with extreme softness and elegance.

At the same time, Albert continues to receive commissions for the creation of various memorials like the one held in 2007 to commemorate the victims of the March 11 attacks in Madrid in 2004, at the railway station of Santa Eugenia, coinciding with the third anniversary.

This year will also be important in his career, because he has started his collaboration with the Alberto Cornejo BAT Gallery in Madrid which represents the sculptor's work in the Art Fair Art Madrid. Also in this gallery, Carlos Albert, shown later among others, are two major individual exhibition projects like Spaces Forged II in 2010, with a great reception by the public and critics and Spaces Forged III in 2012, in which you can see a shift in his work from the technical perspective and composition with different pieces. However, at the same time they are related to each other, giving them all a link that makes clear the trademark of this sculptor.

2008 continued on one hand to be the year of recognition for the artist, who won first prize in competitions such as the consolidated Victorio Macho Award from the City of Palencia and the Manuel Martinez Bragagnolo Sculpture Competition  of the City Council of Majadahonda. On the other hand, regarding his exhibitions, he presented the solo exhibition, Close Encounters of the Four Seventeen Gallery of Madrid, which he had previously exhibited.

In 2010 and 2011 he participated in several group exhibitions, such as the Youth Exchange titled Contemporary Art at the Van Dyck Art Gallery in Gijón, where the work of Carlos Albert achieved recognition and importance within the current art scene.

His presence in the arts sector has increased as time has passed and not only in the Spanish field but also abroad, in such renowned art fairs like Karlshruhe Art Fair and in German art galleries, such as 100KUBIK of Cologne, which in 2013 we will see a selection of works, in order to create greater awareness of his work internationally.

From the beginning of his career, Albert's effort to make visible his work was reflected in numerous solo and group exhibitions in which he participated and in the many events in which his presence has not been unnoticed by the public or by the organizations, earning numerous awards.

Also, Carlos Albert currently is committed to showcasing his work over the Internet and does so through the online art gallery Plastiké Art Gallery.

His career from 1999 until 2012 appears in a collection in a publication of 240 pages, entitled Carlos Albert, sculptor, which includes an interesting essay by the President of the Spanish Association of the Critics of Art, Tomás Paredes. In this book you can see the evolution of his work from the beginning, marked by clear influences of others, and finally evolving to compositions which Albert shows his own personality and personal code, a career that continues to this day to surprise anyone contemplates his sculptures.

As some of the sculptures of Carlos Albert, diaphanous horizon, beginning to chart the direction of its path, its heterodox work, his instincts, his elegant style, his singing Ferruginous radiant...

Tomás Paredes. President of the Spanish Association of Art Critics (Sculpture fragment test (gender, instinct, style) present in the book Carlos Albert, sculptor).

Artistic career

Formación 
1999-2000
 Course at the University Camberwell College of Arts (The London Institute), in London.
2001
 Bachelor's degree in Fine Arts (U.C.M.) Madrid.
2003
 Diploma of Advanced Studies for the PhD (DEA). Faculty of Fine Arts in Madrid. (U.C.M.).

Solo exhibitions 
2016
 “Kunst Zurich Fair”. Solo project; 100 Kubik Gallery. Zurich,  Switzerland.
 “Forged Reality”. Bat Alberto Cornejo Gallery. Madrid.
 “Sculptures in Freedom”. Outdoors exhibition. Segovia.
 “Albert: 2012-2016”. Contemporary Art Museum Infanta Elena. Tomelloso. Spain.
 Art Angler Gallery. New York City. USA.
 “Forged thoughts”. Jordi Pascual Gallery. Barcelona. Spain.
2015
 Fermín Echauri II Gallery. Pamplona. Spain.
 “Reflects”. Outdoor Exhibition in the town of Aranda de Duero. Burgos. Spain.
2014
 “Begegnung”. 100 Kubik Gallery. Cologne. Germany.
2013
 Rafael Lozano Gallery. Madrid. Spain.
 “Zeichnen im Raum”. 100 Kubik Gallery. Cologne. Germany.
 “Paralelisms”. Teknon Centre, in collaboration with Victor Lope. Barcelona. Spain.
2012
 Fermín Echauri Gallery. Pamplona. Spain.
 Atlántica Gallery. La Coruña.  Spain.
 Cartel Gallery, Fine Art. Málaga. Spain.
2011
 “Forged Spaces III”.  Bat Alberto Cornejo Gallery. Madrid. Spain.
2010
 “Forged Spaces II”. Bat Alberto Cornejo Gallery. Madrid. Spain.
2008
 Atlántica Centro de Arte, La Coruña. Spain.
 “Encounters”. Cuatro Diecisiete Gallery. Madrid. Spain.
2006
 “Forged Spaces”. Cuatro Diecisiete Gallery. Madrid. Spain.

Group exhibitions and fairs (selection) 
2017
 “X Years 100 kubik Gallery“. 100 Kubik Gallery. Cologne, Germany.
 “Art Karlsruhe” Fair. 100 Kubik Gallery. Karlsruhe, Germany.
2016
 MDA Gallery, Stockholm, Sweden.
 “Masters of Contemporary Art". Fermín Echauri Gallery. Pamplona.
 "Albano and Carlos Albert". Aurora Vigil-Escalera Gallery. Gijón.
2015
 “Realität ist nicht genug”. 100 Kubik Gallery. Cologne.
 Art Madrid. Bat Alberto Cornejo Gallery. Madrid.
 “Half a century of Cultural Patronage”. Sevillana Endesa Foundation. Real Alcazar de Sevilla.
 “One Artist”, Karlsruhe Art Fair. 100 Kubik Gallery.
2014
 Kunst 14. Zurich Art Fair. 100 Kubik Gallery.
 Art Hamptons. New York City. Art Angler Gallery.
 Feriarte. Alfonso XIII Gallery. Madrid.
 Rodrigo Juarranz Gallery. Aranda de Duero.
 Karlsruhe Art Fair. 100 Kubik.
 Art Madrid. Bat Alberto Cornejo Gallery. Madrid.
2013
 Art Fair Cologne.100 Kubik Gallery. Cologne.
 “Black & White”. Ignacio Lassaletta Gallery. Barcelona.
 Van Dyck Art Gallery. Gijón.
 Rodrigo Juarranz Gallery. Aranda de Duero.
 Karlsruhe Art Fair. 100 Kubik Gallery.
 Art Madrid. Bat Alberto Cornejo Gallery. Madrid.
2012
 “Carlos Albert & Koyama”. Born Art Gallery. Barcelona.
 Van Dyck Art Gallery. Gijón.
 Art Madrid. Bat Alberto Cornejo Gallery. Madrid.
2011
 Van Dyck Art Gallery. Gijón.
 “Sculptural perspective”. Fernán Gómez Gallery. Madrid.
 Foundation AguaGranada. Albaicín. Granada.
2010
 “Small Formats”. Fermín Echauri Gallery. Pamplona.
 Reales Atarazanas. Valencia.
 Luis de Morales Museum. Badajoz.
2009
 “White on Black”. Fermín Echauri Gallery. Pamplona.
2008
 Carmen Carrión Gallery. Santander.
2007
 Palexco Exhibitions Hall. La Coruña.
 “Díaz Caneja Foundation” Museum. Palencia.
2005
 “Díaz Caneja Foundation” Museum. Palencia.
 Sculpture Museum Center. Candas. Asturias.
2004
 Jacinto Higueras Museum. Santisteban del Puerto. Jaén.
 Cuatro Diecisiete Gallery. Madrid.
2003
 “Noventaynueve”. Agustí Massana Hall, P. Espanyol. Barcelona.
2002
 Botanical Garden “Alfonso XII”. Madrid.
 “Around Chirino”, Atlántica Gallery. A Coruña.
 Luis de Ajuría Exhibition Hall, Caja Vital Kutxa. Vitoria-Gasteiz.
 “Sport in Fine Arts”, Centro Cultural Conde Duque. Madrid.
 Exhibitions Hall of the Faculty of Fine Arts in Seville.
2001
 Obispo Vellosillo Art Museum. Ayllón, Segovia.
 Lycée Technique des Arts et Métiers. Luxemburgo.
 Exhibitions Hall of the Faculty of Fine Arts in Madrid.
 San Carlos Royal Academy of Fine Arts. Valencia.
 Martín Chirino Exhibitions Hall. San Sebastián de los Reyes. Madrid.
2000
 Old Contemporary Art Museum of Madrid.
 “Ferreous Wills”. Raquel Ponce Gallery. Madrid.
 Guest at the Graduation Exhibition of the “Camberwell College of Arts” (The London Institute). London.
1999
 “La Forja en Villa Iris”. Marcelino Botín Foundation. Santander.

Grants 
 Complutense University of Madrid. 1999-2000
 Cultural Ministry of Luxembourg. 2001
 Elsa Peretti Foundation. Girona. 2002

Awards (selection) 

 Gold Medal of the Autumn Exhibition of the Royal Academy of Fine Arts, Santa Isabel de Hungría delivered by La Real Maestranza de Caballería de Sevilla. 2016.
 “Sevillana Endesa Foundation” Award in the LXI National Autumn  Exhibition of the “Santa Isabel de Hungría Royal Academy of Fine Arts”. Seville. 2012.
 First prize in the Sculpture Competition of “AguaGranada Foundation”. Granada, 2011.
 First Prize en el National Sculpture Competition “Ciudad de Melilla”. 2008 and 2010.
 First Prize in the XII Sculpture Competition “Manuel Martínez Bragagnolo”. Majadahonda, Madrid, 2008.
 First Sculpture Prize “Victorio Macho” of the Awards “Ciudad de Palencia”, 2008.
 Prize “Cajasol” of “XV Iberian Prize of Sculpture” “Ciudad de Punta Umbría”. Huelva, 2008.
 First Sculpture Prize “Ciudad De Atarfe”. Granada, 2007.
 First Prize of Santander Council for 2 monuments of 3 and 4 meters respectively, 2006.
 First “Sculpture International Prize” of  San Fernando Henares. Madrid. 2005.
 First Prize for the design of a sculpture for the Malaga Council. 2005.
 First Prize of the International Sculpture Competition on the street “Urban Culture” of San Fernando. Cádiz, 2005.
 First Prize in the Sculpture Competition “Inves-Morrazo”, to execute a public sculpture of 6 x 6 x 3,5 m. Pontevedra, 2005.
 Prize “Fundación El Monte” of XIII Iberian Prize of Sculpture “Ciudad de Punta Umbría”. Huelva, 2005.
 First Sculpture Prize of the “XVI Fine Arts Competition, Miguel González Sandoval”. Excmo. Ayuntamiento de Lora del Río. Seville. 2003.
 First Sculpture Prize of the “IV National Competition Fernando Quiñones”. Excmo. Ayuntamiento de Cádiz. 2003.
 First Prize of the “XXII Sculpture Competition Villa de Parla”. 2002.
 First Sculpture Prize of the “VIII National Prize of the University of Seville”, 2002.
 First Prize of the “Fine Arts Competition of the Faculty of Fine Arts of Madrid”, 2001.

Public works museums and collections (selection) 

 Real Maestranza de Caballería. Seville.
 Sevillana Endesa Foundation. Seville.
 Venancio Blanco Foundation. Madrid.
 AguaGranada Foundation. Granada.
 Caixanova Collection. A Coruña.
 Complutense University of Madrid.
 University of Seville.
 FRIDE Foundation.
 Contemporary Art Museum in Ayllon. Segovia.
 City of Salamanca.
 City of Palencia.
 City of Aranda de Duero. Burgos.
 City of Majadahonda. Madrid.
 City of Melilla.
 City of Madrid.
 City of Parla. Madrid.
 City of Santander.
 City of San Fernando. Cádiz.
 City of Móstoles. Madrid.
 City of Cangas de Morrazo, Pontevedra.
 City of Camarma de Esteruelas. Madrid.
 City of Soria.
 City of Atarfe. Granada.
 City of San Fernando de Henares. Madrid.
 City of Málaga.
 City of Lora del Río. Seville.
 City of Punta Umbría. Huelva.

Bibliography 

Albert Andrés, Carlos (2012). Carlos Albert, sculptor. Editorial Godoy. Madrid.

References 

BAT Gallery Alberto Cornejo

Plastiké Art Gallery

Carlos Albert at Born Art Gallery Barcelona

Carlos Albert at Four Seventeen Gallery

Carlos Albert; Art Gallery Wanson

Carlos Albert Escultor; Naos Arquitectura & Libros

Carlos Albert, Sevilla Foundation Award - Endesa

External links 
 Official Website of Carlos Albert
 Carlos Albert, sculptor. Interview in his studio
 Carlos Albert: "The sculptures are closely linked to the drawings"
 Publication: Carlos Albert, sculptor
 Force and Geometry with sculptor Carlos Albert
 Carlos Albert, 100 Kubik

Living people
1978 births
Spanish sculptors
Spanish male sculptors